The West Bengal Legislative Assembly election, 2001 was held in Indian state of West Bengal to elect 294 members of the West Bengal Legislative Assembly.

Results
Left Front led by Communist Party of India (Marxist) won 196 seats, a majority. Chief Minister Buddhadeb Bhattacharjee was reelected as Chief Minister. Pankaj Kumar Banerjee of All India Trinamool Congress, took charge as Leader of the Opposition.

For the first time since 1971, no single party won a majority. This was also the first time since its landslide victory in 1977, that the ruling CPI(M) failed to win a majority on its own. As of 2022, this was also the last time that no single party won an outright majority.

|- align=center
!style="background-color:#E9E9E9" class="unsortable"|
!style="background-color:#E9E9E9" align=center|Political Party
!style="background-color:#E9E9E9" |No. of candidates
!style="background-color:#E9E9E9" |No. of elected
!style="background-color:#E9E9E9" |Number of Votes
!style="background-color:#E9E9E9" |% of Votes
!style="background-color:#E9E9E9" |Seat change
|-
| 
|align="left"|Communist Party of India (Marxist)||211||143||13,402,603||36.59%||
|-
| 
|align="left"|All India Trinamool Congress||226||60||11,229,396||30.66%||
|-
| 
|align="left"|Indian National Congress||60||26||2,921,151||7.98%||
|-
| 
|align="left"|All India Forward Bloc||34||25||2,067,944||5.65%||
|-
| 
|align="left"|Revolutionary Socialist Party||23||17||1,256,951||3.43%||
|-
| 
|align="left"|Communist Party of India||13||7||655,237||1.79%||
|-
| 
|align="left"|West Bengal Socialist Party||4||4||246,407||0.67%||
|-
| 
|align="left"|Gorkha National Liberation Front||5||3||190,057||0.52%||
|-
| 
|align="left"|Biplobi Bangla Congress||1||1||62,611||0.09%||
|-
| 
|align="left"|Independents||530||9||1,848,830||5.05%||
|-
|
|align="left"|Total||1676||294||36,626,099||||
|-
|}

Hashim Abdul Halim was nominated as Speaker of the Legislative Assembly, while Anil Kumar Mukherjee was nominated as Deputy Speaker.

Elected members

References

External links
 West Bangal General Legislative Election Results at the Election Commission of India

State Assembly elections in West Bengal
2000s in West Bengal
West Bengal
May 2001 events in India